István Sipeki (born 17 February 1979 in Eger) is a Hungarian football player who last played for Vác FC.

References

External links
 Player Profile
 
 European Football Clubs & Squads
 

1979 births
Living people
Sportspeople from Eger
Hungarian footballers
Association football midfielders
Egri FC players
Vác FC players
Fehérvár FC players
BFC Siófok players
Diósgyőri VTK players
Panachaiki F.C. players
Paksi FC players
Szolnoki MÁV FC footballers
Nemzeti Bajnokság I players
Hungarian expatriate footballers
Expatriate footballers in Greece
Hungarian expatriate sportspeople in Greece
Nemzeti Bajnokság II players